The 1918 Chicago Naval Reserve football team represented the Chicago Naval Reserve School during the 1918 college football season.
The Naval Reserve School was established on Chicago's Municipal Pier in June 1918. Jerry Johnson was the team's star. A game scheduled for October 19 against Notre Dame was cancelled due to influenza.

Schedule

References

Chicago Naval Reserve
College football undefeated seasons
Chicago Naval Reserve football